Geostilbia is a genus of small air-breathing land snails, terrestrial pulmonate gastropod mollusks in the family Ferussaciidae.

Species
The genus Geostilbia includes the following species:
 Geostilbia aperta (Swainson, 1840)
 Geostilbia blandiana Crosse, 1886
 Geostilbia comorensis Morelet, 1883
 Geostilbia mariei Crosse, 1880
 Geostilbia moellendorffi Pilsbry, 1908
 Geostilbia philippinensis (Semper, 1874)
 Geostilbia philippinica Möllendorff, 1890
 Geostilbia sheilae Groh, 2015
Species brought into synonymy
 Geostilbia caledonica Crosse, 1867: synonym of Geostilbia gundlachi (L. Pfeiffer, 1850)
 Geostilbia gundlachi (L. Pfeiffer, 1850): synonym of Geostilbia aperta (Swainson, 1840)
 Geostilbia stuhlmanni E. von Martens, 1897: synonym of Nothapalus stuhlmanni (E. von Martens, 1897) (original combination)

References

 Bank, R. A. (2017). Classification of the Recent terrestrial Gastropoda of the World. Last update: July 16th, 2017

External links
 Crosse H. (1867). Description d'un genre nouveau et de plusieurs espèces inédites provenant de la Nouvelle-Calédonie. Journal de Conchyliologie. 15(2): 177-194, pls 5, 7.

Ferussaciidae